Personal Knowbase is a freeform notes database application for Microsoft Windows. Personal Knowbase was first released in 1998 on the CompuServe Information Service and is an example of a personal knowledge base.

Text articles are displayed in a flat, rather than tree-based, listing. Stored articles are retrieved using a scheme based on user-defined keywords. This type of keyword-based system was based on the keyword systems used by common research databases of the 1990s, such as Knowledge Index and CompuServe's file library, and is similar to the keywords Index for a MS Help file. In recent Internet usage, such keywords are now often referred to as metadata "tags". Articles are filtered using various criteria, including keywords, dates, and attachments.

A free read-only version of the program, called Personal Knowbase Reader, is available to allow for distribution of content in the Personal Knowbase format.

Features
Boolean queries on keywords
Hypertext links to external files and between articles
Attachments to external files and URLs
Password protection
Reminders
Export to external formats
Import external formats

Portability
Personal Knowbase is a portable application and can be installed directly onto a USB flash drive.

See also
List of personal information managers
List of portable software

References

Notes

Tucows.com Spotlight on Personal Knowbase
The 2005 WD Guide to Writing Software
Review on TechNewsWorld
Stephen Davies, Still Building the Memex, Communications of the ACM, Volume 54 Issue 2, February 2011

External links

Portable Installation

Note-taking software
Personal information managers